Joder may refer to:

Joder or Yoder, a Swiss form of the name Theodore
Joder, Nebraska
Rudolf Joder
A Spanish equivalent for "to fuck"